Marcela Cubillos Sigall (born 2 February 1967) is a Chilean politician and lawyer, militant from Unión Demócrata Independiente (UDI). She was Minister of State in Education and Environment portfolios from 2018 to 2020, during the second government of Sebastián Piñera (2018–2022).

Education 
Cubillos Sigall studied Law at the Pontificia Universidad Católica de Chile.

References

External links
 

1967 births
Living people
Chilean people
Pontifical Catholic University of Chile alumni
21st-century Chilean politicians
Independent Democratic Union politicians
Members of the Chilean Constitutional Convention
Chilean Ministers of Education
Government ministers of Chile
Women government ministers of Chile